Penn Zero: Part-Time Hero is an American animated television series produced by Disney Television Animation for Disney XD. The series debuted on December 5, 2014, as a preview, followed by the official premiere on February 13, 2015. The series was ordered on October 16, 2013, for a scheduled fall 2014 premiere. The series' co-creator, Jared Bush, also co-wrote and co-directed Walt Disney Animation Studios' 2016 film Zootopia.

On April 22, 2015, it was announced that the series had been renewed for a second season. On July 19, 2016, it was announced that the show had been canceled after two seasons. The series ended on July 28, 2017 with the hour-long series finale, "At the End of the Worlds". 35 episodes were produced.

Plot
The series follows the adventures of Penn Zero, who unexpectedly inherits the job of his parents: being a part-time hero. Penn must zap into various dimensions to take on the role of the hero in that world and save the day in their place. With the help of his friends, Boone, the part-time wiseman, and Sashi, the part-time sidekick, he must save the worlds from Rippen, a part-time villain and his part-time minion and principal of Penn's school, Larry.

Episodes

Characters

Main
 Penn Zero (voiced by Thomas Middleditch) - The main protagonist, a part-time hero and the son of two full-time heroes. Penn lives with his Aunt Rose and Uncle Chuck due to Rippen trapping his parents in a dangerous dimension known as the "Most Dangerous World Imaginable", and goes on part-time hero missions with his best friends Sashi and Boone. While Penn is the recognized leader of the group, he often asks advice from his parents by communicating with them through a futuristic device called a MUHU (Multi-Universe Hologram Uplink), and finds himself needing counsel from his friends as well.
 Boone Wiseman (voiced by Adam DeVine) - Penn's best friend, and a part-time wise man. Boone often bewilders his friends with his unconventional methods and thought processes, and at times they find him frustrating. While he is not the brightest, however, Boone's unorthodox style has proven effective in helping his friends complete missions. Boone was at one point a victim of severe aquaphobia, but later overcame it while visiting an underwater world in "Chicken or Fish?". His parents, like Penn's, were part-time heroes.
 Sashi Kobayashi (voiced by Tania Gunadi) - Penn's second best friend (later girlfriend in the series finale), and a part-time sidekick. Sashi is the only girl on Penn's team, and is fairly tomboyish and aggressive, with a violent attitude. The forms Sashi takes often provoke teasing from her teammates, but it doesn't stop her from proving how tough she is. Sashi is often a voice of reason and understanding despite her demeanor. Sashi wears futuristic glasses that the gang refer to as "the Specs," which can project holographic displays that inform the trio about their missions. However, Sashi is also the only member of Penn's team to have parents that were not part-time heroes, which explains that in the season 2 episode "The Kobayashis", Sashi's parents were unaware of her job as a part-time sidekick to help save worlds, and thought that she worked at the local "Fish Stick on a Stick" restaurant-which is actually the headquarters of the part-time villains.
 Phyllis (voiced by Sam Levine) - A grouchy, often irritable Slavic woman who maintains the Multi Universe Transprojector (MUT) used by Penn and his team to travel to other worlds and fight evil. The MUT is located in an abandoned movie theater called The Odyssey, which is right next door to the part-time villains' base in Fish Stick on a Stick. It is revealed during a flashback in "Zap One" that it was Phyllis who chose Penn's parents to be part-time heroes, and chose Penn as well. She also has a pet bear named Karen for security. In the series finale, it is revealed she is the good half of a powerful entity called the Guardian.
 Karen - A guard bear owned by Phyllis. In the season finale, Phyllis gave Karen to Boone.

Villains
 Rippen (voiced by Alfred Molina) - The main antagonist and a part-time villain. Rippen is convinced of his own genius but often finds himself dealing with the stupidity of his minion Larry. Rippen hates Penn and his friends and is fully aware who they really are, but is constantly thwarted by them in other worlds. Rippen's normal appearance includes pale skin and black hair. When not being a part-time villain, Rippen is the art teacher at Penn's high school. His great aspiration is to become a full-time villain, which requires that he successfully accomplish an evil scheme without being thwarted by Penn's team. In "Cereal Criminals" he mentions that he has a sister named Vlurgen who was favored by their parents. In "Zap One" it is revealed during a flashback that it was Rippen who tricked Penn's parents into the Most Dangerous World Imaginable. In the season 2 episode "Mr. Rippen," it is revealed that Rippen is actually from another dimension and was chosen by Phil to live in Middleberg and be a part-time villain. In the series finale, Rippen plans to conquer the Most Dangerous World Imaginable with Larry and those with him after having to close its portal from the other side.
 Larry (voiced by Larry Wilmore) - Rippen's part-time minion, a glasses-wearing man who is more idiotic, friendly and nice than evil, and who usually does more to annoy Rippen than to fight Penn and his teammates. When not being a part-time minion, Larry is the principal of Penn's high school. He seems to be extremely lucky as shown in the episode "Larry Manor", where he revealed to Penn that he had won the lottery 32 times. He has the tendency to monologue, much to Rippen's chagrin, and his discussions often reinforce the fact that he's somewhat out of touch with reality. His only villainous virtue is that he is blindly loyal to Rippen, to the point that Rippen is willing at times to forgive his incompetence. Larry's futuristic glasses can project holographic displays with info on their missions, similar to Sashi's.
 Phil (voiced by Sam Levine) - Rippen and Larry's Slavic assistant who operates their portal in the Fish Stick on a Stick restaurant. Like Penn's portal operator Phyllis, he usually seems to be in a sour mood. In the series finale, it is revealed he is the evil half of a powerful entity called the Guardian.

The heroes' family
 Vonnie Zero (voiced by Lea Thompson) - Penn's mother, a part-time sidekick who, because of Rippen, is trapped in the "Most Dangerous World Imaginable", with her husband Brock. She loves her son dearly, and understands that he misses them. However, her loving motherly side is coupled with a warrior's aggression not unlike Sashi's, and she is quite capable of handling herself in a fight despite being an ordinary human.
 Brock Zero (voiced by Gary Cole) - Penn's father, a part-time hero who, because of Rippen, is trapped in the "Most Dangerous World Imaginable" with his wife Vonnie. Brock is part fearless fighter, part loving father, with a tendency to bring up embarrassing things during holographic chats with his son and Penn's friends. He also appears to have a rather antagonistic relationship with Penn's uncle Chuck.
 Aunt Rose (voiced by Rosie Perez) - Penn's aunt whom he is staying with while his parents are away. Aunt Rose appears to have little in common with her relatives, and Penn struggles somewhat with living under the same roof with her and her husband Chuck.
 Uncle Chuck (voiced by Lenny Venito) - Penn's uncle, a balding man who-along with his wife Rose-is apparently uninvolved in the family hero business. The pair of them find other pursuits-such as dressing their pet chinchilla (named The Chinchilla) in sweaters and business suits-far more entertaining. The same cannot be said for The Chinchilla, who seems perpetually contemptuous of the things his owners subject him to. In "The QPC", it is revealed that Phil is on Chuck's bowling team, and that Chuck is Phil's best customer at "Fish Stick on a Stick".
 Sylvester and Tia Kobayashi (voiced by George Takei and Lauren Tom) - Sashi's parents, who, unlike Boone and Penn's parents, were never part-time heroes. They found out that Sashi is a part-time sidekick in the season 2 episode "The Kobayashis".

Recurring characters
 Old Man Middleburg (voiced by Jess Harnell) - An elderly resident of Middleburg who knows too much and has a history with Larry, in the season 2 finale, he gets his mansion back by Larry.
 Alex (voiced by Brandon Scott) - The friendly jock at Middleburg Central High.
 Teddy (voiced by Thomas Middleditch) - A student at Middleburg Central High School who is liked by Sashi.
 Human King (voiced by Clancy Brown) - A citadel at business who is disliked by Penn Zero.

Residing in other dimensions

 Sheriff Scaley and Amber Briggs (voiced by Beau Bridges and Olivia Holt) - A father and daughter from the town of Big Butte in a world where cowboys ride dinosaurs and pterodactyls. Scaley is the town's aged-and intermittently lucid-lawman, who first joined up with Penn and company to prevent Rippen and Larry from stealing the townfolks' money from the town bank. Amber wanted to help her father enforce law and order but was barred by Scaley, which prompted her to join up with Rippen and Larry on their second mission to Big Butte when they attempted to rustle all the town's Triceratopses. However, after realizing that her father truly did care for her, she helped him and the heroes bring the villains in. The pair later appeared again when the villains' efforts to sabotage the heroes' portal resulted in the opening of vortexes that threatened to consume the multiverse. In the series finale, Scaley Briggs officially retires as sheriff of Big Butte and gives the job to his daughter Amber from which she gladly accepts.
 Captain Super Captain (voiced by Adam West) - Captain Super Captain is a hero and electrician from a world where superheroes and supervillains are common. He possesses superpowers like flight, super strength, and energy manipulation. Captain Super Captain has the tendency to say his name loudly and dragged out. The team first met Captain Super Captain during a mission to stop Rippen and Larry from stealing the superpowers of all the heroes, and succeeded by helping him and the other heroes realize that they still could fight evil despite lacking their powers. He would then team up with them during their second visit to the world, during which his brother/nemesis Professor Evil Professor used an evil medallion to brainwash all the heroes into becoming evil. Captain Super Captain was the only hero to escape this effect, and joined with the team in facing down his brother. Captain Super Captain was later one of the inter-dimensional allies who joined the heroes to save the universe from vortexes.
 Professor Evil Professor (voiced by Adam West) - The evil brother and nemesis of Captain Super Captain who has Ph.D in villainy. Like his brother, he has a tendency to say his name loudly and dragged out. In the series finale, Professor Evil Professor is among those who accompany Rippen to the Most Dangerous World Imaginable.
 Blaze (voiced by Sean Astin) - A hotshot flyer from a world where humanoid dragons work at a flight academy resembling an Air Force base. Blaze embodies coolness, from his multiple sets of aviator sunglasses to his talents in flight, fire-breathing, and saxophone playing; he also refers to himself in the Third person. Blaze was pitted against Penn by Rippen, a rivalry accentuated by the fact that Sashi-in dragon form-developed a crush on Blaze. However, the two ended up joining forces to defeat Rippen, and Blaze subsequently joined the team to help save the multiverse from a series of destructive vortexes. In the season 2 episode "Alpha, Bravo, Unicorn," Blaze had lost his confidence after losing a fight with the winged unicorn General Bighorn, and a result gave up flying and became overweight, but after getting a pep talk from Sashi he regained his confidence and helped destroy the unicorns' battle station.
 Princess Argelbleccht Blunkenthorthph (voiced by Elizabeth Henstridge) - The spoiled, beautiful princess of her kind on the Alien World.
 Nug (voiced by Maria Bamford) - A cavewoman from the Caveman Spy World and member of the secret agency C.L.I.A. (short for Caveman Low Intelligence Agency) that employs primitive Stone Age gadgetry. After their initial visit to her world, Nug was one of several individuals accidentally pulled into Penn's world by a malfunctioning portal, who then joined the heroes in a mission to close a series of vortexes that threatened to consume all reality. After seeing other worlds, Nug loathed the idea of being forced to return to her own world and was tricked by Rippen into entering one of the vortexes in an effort to get rid of Penn. Their allies managed to rescue them, and Nug was returned home.
 Lady Starblaster (voiced by Sigourney Weaver) - An evil space villain from the Galaxy World who is Rippen's love interest. In the series finale, Lady Starblaster is among those who accompany Rippen to the Most Dangerous World Imaginable.
 Shirley B. Awesome (voiced by Wanda Sykes) - A female military action figure who helped Penn and his team while they were action figures in a backyard world. She later joined the team to help save the multiverse from a series of destructive vortexes.
 Maria (voiced by Sonequa Martin-Green) - A pirate from the Pirate World who was a love interest of Penn.
 Boat Maria (voiced by Yvette Nicole Brown) - A talking dolphin-shaped pirate ship that serves as Maria's mode of transportation.
 Milkman (voiced by Paul Reubens) - A villainous milkman who resides in Cereal World and can ruin cereal crops with his milk.

Production
The art style of the series was inspired by the look of animated films in the 1950s and 1960s, mostly the Disney work by such influential artists as Mary Blair, Eyvind Earle, Tom Oreb and Milt Kahl, but also from the more abstract and textured work of studios like UPA and Hanna-Barbera.

The series' original score was composed by Ryan Shore.

Broadcast
Penn Zero: Part-Time Hero premiered on Disney XD in Canada on March 16, 2015. The series debuted on Disney XD in the United Kingdom and Ireland on May 14, on Disney XD in Australia on June 1, and on Disney XD in both the Middle East and Africa on September 7.

References

External links

2014 American television series debuts
2017 American television series endings
2010s American animated television series
American children's animated adventure television series
American children's animated comic science fiction television series
Disney XD original programming
English-language television shows
Television series by Disney Television Animation
Television series set in the future
Television series about parallel universes